Egiona is a genus of true weevils in the beetle family Curculionidae. There are at least three described species in Egiona.

Species
These three species belong to the genus Egiona:
 Egiona circumcincta Voss, 1953
 Egiona konoi Nakane, 1963
 Egiona laeta Pascoe, 1874

References

Further reading

 
 
 

Weevils